Tsatsos (genitive case form for female name bearers: Tsatsou ) is a Greek family name. Notable people with this name include:

Tsatsos 
 Dimitrios I. Tsatsos (1859–1921), Greek politician and lawyer
 Dimitris Tsatsos (1906–1971), Greek legal scholar and former Member of the European Parliament
 Konstantinos Tsatsos (1899–1987), Greek diplomat, professor of law, scholar and politician
 Themistokles Tsatsos (1906–1970), Greek jurist and diplomat

Tsatsou 
 Dora Tsatsou (1932–2000), Greek choreographer
 Theodosia Tsatsou (born 1969), Greek singer

References 

Greek-language surnames
Surnames